Passing Through is the second album by American singer/songwriter Owen Temple. It was released in 1999 on El Paisano Records.

Track listing
All songs (Temple) except where noted
“Downtown” - 3:43 	   
“Driving Myself Crazy” (Temple, Paul Lee) - 3:18 	
“Can't Keep My Mind Off You” - 3:07 	
“Treat You Like I Do” - 4:21 	
“Lights of Town” - 4:08
“Open Window” - 2:25
“Listening to the A.M.” - 3:17
“House of Cards” - 3:24
“One Less Thing to Worry About” - 2:41
“Long Gone Daddy” (Hank Williams)- 3:08
“Passing Through” - 4:02
“I Wrote You a Waltz” - 2:41

Credits

Musicians
 Owen Temple - Acoustic
 Lloyd Maines - Electric guitar, Acoustic, Pedal steel, Mandolin, Dobro, Harmony vocals on "Can't Keep My Mind Off You" and "Passing Through"
 Michael Tarabay - Bass 
 Darcie Deaville - Fiddle
 Bukka Allen - Accordion, Piano
 Mark Patterson - drums 
 Zack Taylor - drums
 Fred Remmert - percussion
 Terri Hendrix - Harmony vocals on "Can't Keep My Mind Off You," "Open Window," "House of Cards," and "Passing Through"
 Ryan Lynch - Harmony vocals on "Downtown," "Driving Myself Crazy," "Treat You Like I Do," "Lights of Town," "Listening to the A.M.," "One Less Thing to Worry About," "Long Gone Daddy," and "Like We Still Care"

Production
Produced by Lloyd Maines
Engineered by Fred Remmert
Recorded at Cedar Creek Studios, Austin, Texas

Artwork
Art Direction/Design by Russ C. Smith
Photography by Stephen L. Clark and Owen Temple

Releases

External links 
Owen Temple website
El Paisano Records website

References 

Owen Temple albums
1999 albums